Talkot (Nepali: तलकोट ) is a Gaupalika(Nepali: गाउपालिका ; gaupalika) in Bajhang District in the Sudurpashchim Province of far-western Nepal. 
Talkot has a population of 11557.The land area is 335.26 km2.

References

Rural municipalities in Bajhang District
Rural municipalities of Nepal established in 2017